Municipality of Rosario is a municipality in Sinaloa in northwestern Mexico. Its seat is the city of El Rosario. According to 2010 census it had 49,380 inhabitants.

Political Subdivision
Rosario Municipality is subdivided in 8 sindicaturas:
Potrerillos
Cacalotan
Matatan
La Rastra
Maloya
Pozole
Aguaverde
Chametla

References

Municipalities of Sinaloa

de:Rosario (Sinaloa)
nl:El Rosario (Sinaloa)
pt:Rosario (Sinaloa)
ru:Росарио (Синалоа)